Yunnan is a de jure province in the Republic of China according to the ROC law, as the ROC government formally claims to be the legitimate government of the whole China. It was one of the 22 provinces set up during the Qing dynasty. As one of the 6 provinces in South China, the territory it administers was slightly larger than the present-day Yunnan.

As the ROC does not recognize changes in administrative divisions made by the PRC, including this province, official maps of the ROC government shows Yunnan in its pre-1949 boundaries.

Administration
The province inherited the borders of the Qing-Dynasty province, bordering Sikang, Szechwan, Kweichow, Kwanghsi, and the countries Vietnam, Laos, Myanmar, and India. The claimed boundaries of the province included all of today's Yunnan and parts of Panzhihua, Sichuan and Myanmar. The province had an area of 420,465 km2.

History

Following the collapse of the Qing Dynasty in 1911, Yunnan came under the control of local warlords, who had more than the usual degree of autonomy due to Yunnan's remoteness.  They financed their regime through opium harvesting and traffic.

Cai E is regarded as the founder of the Yunnan clique when at the request of Liang Qichao in 1915, he declared Yunnan's opposition to Yuan Shikai's monarchy.  Cai died from natural causes shortly after the successful National Protection War. His chief lieutenant, Tang Jiyao, took over Yunnan and demanded that the National Assembly be restored. When this was accomplished, Yunnan officially reunified with the national government but kept its provincial army separate due to the Beiyang Army's grip in Beijing politics. In 1927, Long Yun seized control of the clique; Tang died shortly after. Long then re-aligned Yunnan under the Nationalist government in Nanjing but stringently guarded the province's autonomy.

In Second Sino-Japanese War, Yunnan served as, among other things, a home base for the Flying Tigers. The Burma Road was constructed, along which supplies travelled into the province and then into the heart of China. In 1942 the Chinese Expeditionary Force entered Burma to fight with the British against the Japanese invasion, eventually fighting to a standstill across the Nu River for 2 years. The province was also a refuge for people, especially university faculty and students, from the east.  These had originally retreated to Changsha, but as the Japanese forces were gaining more territory they eventually bombed Changsha in February 1938. The 800 staff faculty and students who were left had to flee and made the 1,000-mile journey to Kunming. It was here that the National Southwest Associated University (commonly known as Lianda) was established. In these extraordinary wartime circumstances for eight years, staff, professors and students had to survive and operate in makeshift quarters that were subject to sporadic bombing campaigns by Japan. There were dire shortages of food, equipment, books, clothing and other essential needs, but they did manage to conduct the running of a modern university. Over those eight years of war (1937–1945), Lianda became famous nationwide for having and producing many, if not most, of China's most prominent academics, scholars, scientists and intellectuals.  Both of China's only Nobel laureates in physics studied at Lianda.

After the end of the Second Sino-Japanese War, Long was removed from office. During the Chinese Civil War, Nationalist forces retreated to the southwest provinces of Szechwan, Sikang, and Yunnan. In 9 December 1949, Chairperson of the Provincial Government Lu Han defected to the Communists and most of the Nationalist troops were defeated in the province. Remnants of the Nationalist forces, led by Li Mi and using Mong Hsat as a base, engaged in guerrilla warfare against the Communists, briefly capturing parts of Yunnan territory. In 1951 the provincial government in exile was dissolved and in 1954, Li Mi's remaining troops retreated to Taiwan.

Demographics

List of governors

Chairperson of the Provincial Government

References

History of Yunnan
South China
Provinces of the Republic of China (1912–1949)